J. Riley Stone (born James Riley Stone; October 17, 1886 in Sully County, South Dakota – ?) was a member of the Wisconsin State Assembly. He attended high school in Reedsburg, Wisconsin before graduating from the University of Wisconsin-Madison. Stone later served in World War I. From 1945 to 1949, he was Sheriff of Sauk County, Wisconsin.

Political career
Stone was first elected to the Assembly in 1946. Additionally, he was Postmaster and Clerk of Reedsburg. He was a Republican.

References

People from Sully County, South Dakota
People from Reedsburg, Wisconsin
Republican Party members of the Wisconsin State Assembly
Wisconsin postmasters
Wisconsin sheriffs
Military personnel from Wisconsin
American military personnel of World War I
University of Wisconsin–Madison alumni
1886 births
Year of death missing